Tapan Barua (date of birth unknown, died 9 June 2014) was an Indian cricketer. He played fifteen first-class matches for Assam between 1956 and 1966.

References

External links
 

Year of birth missing
2014 deaths
Indian cricketers
Assam cricketers
Place of birth missing